Võru County ( or Võrumaa) is a county in southern Estonia. It is bordered by Valga County and Põlva County and is the only Estonian county bordering two countries - Latvia (Alūksne Municipality and Ape Municipality) in the south and Russian Federation (Pskov Oblast) in the east.

In 2022 Võru County had a population of 34,182, 2.6% of the total population in Estonia. The county is subdivided into 12 rural municipalities and one urban municipality, the county capital, Võru.

Ethnic Division and Culture 

In Võru County, there are 95.3% Estonians, 3.3% Russians and 1.4% other nationalities. Two indigenous ethnic groups live in Võru County – the Võro people and the Setos. Both ethnic groups have their own language (Võro, Seto) and cultural heritage in traditions.

Võro People 
The Võro Institute is established for the preservation and promotion of the Võro language and culture, which are tightly connected with its historic centre, the rural and mostly agricultural South-Eastern Estonian county of Võromaa.

The Võro Institute was founded by the Estonian government in 1995. The institute is engaged in a wide range of activities, including establishing school programs, conducting linguistic and regional research, preserving place-names and their corresponding stories, publishing Võro-language scholarship and school textbooks, and organizing annual language conferences etc. The aim of these activities is to encourage the Võro people to speak their own language and to preserve their characteristic life-style.

In 2014, the smoke sauna tradition in Võrumaa was added to the UNESCO list of intangible cultural heritage. Smoke saunas along with sauna rituals are a part of traditional life and cultural heritage of the Võro people. A smoke sauna is an old-fashioned rural sauna, which has no chimney.

Setos 
The purpose of the Seto Institute is to coordinate and promote research in the field of the Seto region and the Seto culture and to introduce the results of the research to the public. The Seto Institute publishes papers, organizes events and organizes education in the field of Seto culture in cooperation with other organizations in the Seto region. In 2009, the Setos’ polyphonic style of folk singing, called leelo, was added to the UNESCO list of intangible cultural heritage. Believed to be at least 1,000 years old, leelo is considered a special local variant of the Baltic-Finnic runo song tradition.

Religion

Economy 

The county's main economic sectors are forestry and wood processing, furniture and food indusy and also tourism. According to statistics of 2011, there are 1852 SMEs in Võru County. 47% of enterprises in the county belong to primary sector (agriculture, forestry), 38% of enterprises work in tertiary sector (trade, services) and 15% of enterprises are involved in secondary sector (processing industry). The biggest foreign owned companies based in Võru County are AS Toftan (wood processing), AS Barrus (wood processing), AS Antsla Inno (furniture production), AS Rauameister (metal processing), AS Võru Juust (food processing) and Danpower GmbH (energy production). 

The county enjoys an advantageous location due to its relative proximity to Pskov in Russia (100 km) and Riga in Latvia (220 km). Accessibility is provided by several transport corridors running through the county. One of the most important transit routes in Estonia, Tallinn-Tartu-Pskov, passes the county. The South-East corner of the county is crossed by the Riga-Pskov-St Petersburg major road. The county is strategically placed on trade routes between the East and West.

Education 
The county has 23 schools with approximately 1500 pupils. One vocational school, Võru County Vocational Training Center, offers 33 different practical curriculums in various levels for 600 students.

Culture and Events 
Võrumaa is a distinctive region bearing the culture of Võro and Seto.

Smaller sub-areas are tightly covered with community centres, libraries, museums and sport centres. Larger cultural and sport facilities are Võru Culture Center Kannel, Võrumaa Central library, Võro Institute, the Vana-Võromaa Culture House and the Võrumaa Sport Centre.

There are many traditional and non-traditional cultural and sport events taking place in the county, which are organized by different associations and non-profit organizations. The cultural landscape is shaped by events such as Võru Folk Festival, song festival Uma Pido, Ostrova Festival of traditional Seto and modern pop music, food fair UMA MEKK, unique Lindora fair, Võhandu International Canoeing Marathon, Haanja Ski Marathon, Rõuge Boar Race, and many more.

History

Võrumaa in its historical borders (Võro: Vana Võromaa) included eight parishes: Karula, Hargla, Urvaste, Rõuge, Kanepi, Põlva, Räpina and Vastseliina.

These parishes are currently centered (due to redistricting) in Võru and Põlva Counties with parts extending into Valga and Tartu Counties. 

From 1944 to 1953, the Estonian Forest Brothers (anti-Soviet partisans) were most active in Võru County.

County Government
Võru County Government (Maavalitsus) is a regional government agency, directed by the County Governor (maavanem), who represents the national interests in the county and is responsible for the balanced and comprehensive development of the county. The County Governor is appointed to the office by the Government of Estonia for a 5-year term, on the proposal of the Minister of Regional Affairs. Since 2010 the Governor position is taken by Andres Kõiv.

Municipalities
Today Võru County consists 5 municipalities that work together to facilitate the county's balanced and sustainable development. 5 municipalities are divided for one urban - Võru - and 4 rural municipalities (vallad - parishes) - Antsla, Rõuge, Setomaa, Võru. In Võru County there are two towns (linnad - Võru and Antsla) and approximately 570 villages.

Former rural municipalities:
Antsla Parish (includes the town of Antsla)
Haanja Parish
Lasva Parish
Meremäe Parish
Misso Parish
Mõniste Parish
Rõuge Parish
Sõmerpalu Parish
Urvaste Parish
Varstu Parish
Vastseliina Parish
Võru Parish

Gallery

References
Hella Keem (1997): Võru keel. Eesti teaduste akadeemia Emakeele selts. Tallinn.
Aune Valk (2000): Võrokeste identiteedist. Kadri Koreinik, Jan Rahman (toim.) A kiilt rahvas kynõlõs.. Võrokeste keelest, kommetest, identiteedist (lk. 39–56). Võro Instituut'. Võro.

External links

Võru County Tourist Information
Industrial areas and business opportunities in Võru County
Võru County Government
Võru town
Võru County Vocational Training Center
Võru County Development Agency
Võro Institute

 
Counties of Estonia